Vedder Van Dyck (July 18, 1889 - August 2, 1960) was the fifth bishop of the Episcopal Diocese of Vermont.

Biography
A graduate of Columbia College (1918) and the General Theological Seminary in New York (1914), he was consecrated on February 24, 1936. His consecrators were James DeWolf Perry, Henry Knox Sherrill and John T. Dallas. Prior to this, Van Dyck was served Saint Mary's Church in Amityville, New York, where he was ordained as deacon (April 25, 1914), priest (1915), and priest-in-charge and rector (1917–1929).  He died in office on August 2, 1960, and was succeeded by Harvey D. Butterfield.

He was a Freemason under the jurisdiction of the Grand Lodge of New York.

References

1889 births
1960 deaths
Episcopal bishops of Vermont
People from Amityville, New York
Columbia College (New York) alumni
20th-century American Episcopalians